"Blick Blick" is a song by American rapper Coi Leray and Trinidadian rapper Nicki Minaj. It was released through Republic Records and 1801 on March 18, 2022 as the fifth and last single of Leray's debut studio album Trendsetter. The song was written by the artists alongside Randall Hammers, Asia Smith, and producers Dr. Luke, Rocco Did It Again!, Ryan Ogren, and Mike Crook. The single peaked at number 37 on the US Billboard Hot 100 and number 68 in Canada.

Background and promotion
In February 2022, Leray's father, fellow American rapper Benzino, revealed that his daughter had a collaboration with Minaj, who then denied having worked with any artist recently. However, Benzino later apologized for announcing the joint effort. On March 14, 2022, Minaj revealed through a Q&A session on Twitter with her fans that she pulled her verse from "Blick Blick" due to Benzino previously announcing the team-up, but stated that she had a private conversation with Leray, in which she sympathized with her and decided to keep it on the song; the two artists announced the song the same day. On March 23, 2022, Minaj also praised Leray for her confidence on social media and Leray praised Minaj in return.

Composition and lyrics
On "Blick Blick", Leray and Minaj confidently rap about their sexual activity and boast about their lavish lifestyles, while taking shots at their opponents. The "electric" song sees Leray using onomatopoeias in the chorus and the second half of her verse and Minaj name-drop DMX and Jeff Bezos, as well as give Leray a co-sign.

Music video
The official music video for "Blick Blick" premiered on Leray's YouTube channel thirteen hours after the release of the song on March 18, 2022. Sporting 1990s-inspired outfits, Leray performs choreographed dances until Minaj joins her for what she had previously described as the "verse of the year" and the two artists then sport pink wigs and shoot at their opponents.

Credits and personnel

 Coi Leray – vocals, songwriting
 Nicki Minaj – vocals, songwriting
 Dr. Luke – production, songwriting, programming
 Rocco Did It Again! – production, songwriting, programming
 Ryan Ogren – production, songwriting, programming
 Mike Crook – production, songwriting, programming
 Randall Hammers – songwriting
 Asia Smith – songwriting
 Clint Gibbs – production coordination
 Ashlee Gibbs – production coordination
 Serban Ghenea – mixing
 John Hanes – immersive mixing
 Kalani Thompson – engineering
 Tyler Sheppard – engineering
 Grant Horton – recording assistance
 Aubrey "Big Juice" Delaine – vocal mixing, vocal engineering

Charts

References

2022 singles
2022 songs
Coi Leray songs
Nicki Minaj songs
Songs written by Coi Leray
Songs written by Nicki Minaj
Songs written by Dr. Luke
Songs written by Ryan Ogren
Song recordings produced by Dr. Luke
Trap music songs